Daig Kayo ng Lola Ko ( / international title: My Fairy Grandmother) is a Philippine television drama fantasy anthology series broadcast by GMA Network. Directed by Rico Gutierrez, it stars Gloria Romero. It premiered on April 30, 2017 on the network's Sunday Grande sa Gabi line up replacing Tsuperhero.

Premise
Narrating the adventures of Lola Goreng, and her grandchildren Alice and Elvis, who find themselves living with Moira, a kid who they found on the streets.

Cast and characters
Lead cast
 Gloria Romero as Gloria "Goreng" Espino
 Jillian Ward as Alice Espino
 Chlaui Malayao as Moira Villavicencio
 David Remo as Elvis Espino
 TG Daylusan as Pipoy
 Julius Miguel as Jorrel
 Angelica Ulip as Tintin
 Frances Makil-Ignacio as Mila / Metring
 Nova Villa as Dee

Production
Principal photography was halted in March 2020 due to the enhanced community quarantine in Luzon caused by the COVID-19 pandemic. The series resumed its programming on July 18, 2021.

Ratings
According to AGB Nielsen Philippines' Nationwide Urban Television Audience Measurement People in television homes, the pilot episode of Daig Kayo ng Lola Ko earned an 8.5% rating. The show got its highest rating on October 29, 2017 with a 12.5% rating.

Accolades

References

External links
 
 

2017 Philippine television series debuts
Filipino-language television shows
GMA Network original programming
Philippine anthology television series
Philippine children's television series
Television productions suspended due to the COVID-19 pandemic